Joaquin Phoenix is an American actor who started his career performing as a child on television. He appeared on the shows Seven Brides for Seven Brothers (1982) and Backwards: The Riddle of Dyslexia (1984) with his brother River Phoenix and on an episode of Murder, She Wrote (1984) with his sister Summer Phoenix. He made his feature film debut in SpaceCamp (1986) and had his first starring role in Russkies (1987). His first major film release was Ron Howard's dramedy Parenthood (1989) with Steve Martin. During his period as a child actor, he was credited as Leaf Phoenix, his self-given name. Six years later, he changed his name back to Joaquin and co-starred opposite Nicole Kidman in the Gus Van Sant-directed crime comedy-drama To Die For (1995), a critical hit. In 1997, Phoenix co-starred in Oliver Stone's crime thriller U Turn opposite Sean Penn and starred opposite Liv Tyler in the coming-of-age film Inventing the Abbotts. Phoenix starred in the crime-comedy film Clay Pigeons (1998), Return to Paradise (1998) followed by a role in the crime mystery thriller 8mm (1999) with Nicolas Cage. Phoenix's first role in 2000 was in his first collaboration with director James Gray in the crime film The Yards. He followed this with supporting roles in the Ridley Scott-directed historical epic Gladiator (2000) opposite Russell Crowe and as priest Abbé de Coulmier in the Philip Kaufman-directed period film Quills (2000), opposite Geoffrey Rush. For his role as the villain Commodus in the former, Phoenix earned a nomination for the Academy Award for Best Supporting Actor.

The following year he starred in a satire of the US military, Buffalo Soldiers (2001). Phoenix starred opposite Mel Gibson in the science fiction thriller Signs (2002), a massive commercial success. He starred in the romance-drama It's All About Love (2003) and voiced Kenai in the animated film Brother Bear. In 2004, Phoenix starred as a farmer in the psychological thriller The Village and as a Baltimore firefighter in the drama Ladder 49. He followed this with a supporting role in the historical drama film Hotel Rwanda (2004). Phoenix portrayed musician Johnny Cash in the biopic Walk the Line (2005) opposite Reese Witherspoon. Phoenix played and sang all of Cash's vocal tracks in the film and on the accompanying soundtrack. This earned him the Golden Globe Award for Best Actor  – Motion Picture Musical or Comedy, Grammy Award for Best Compilation Soundtrack for Visual Media and garnered his first nomination for the Academy Award for Best Actor. He also narrated the animal rights documentary Earthlings (2005). This was followed by a reteam with Gray in the crime drama We Own the Night (2007) and the lead role in the drama Reservation Road (2007) opposite Mark Ruffalo. The following year, he made his third film with Gray, Two Lovers (2008) and followed this with the mockumentary I'm Still Here (2010). Throughout the filming period, Phoenix remained in character for public appearances, giving many the impression that he was genuinely pursuing a new career as a rapper.

Phoenix starred as a World War II veteran in the Paul Thomas Anderson-directed drama film The Master opposite Philip Seymour Hoffman. The role earned him a Volpi Cup and his second nomination for the Academy Award for Best Actor. The following year, he reteamed with Gray once again in the drama film The Immigrant opposite Marion Cotillard. Phoenix starred as a man who develops a relationship with Samantha, an intelligent computer operating system in the Spike Jonze-directed romantic science fiction film Her (2013) and starred as a private investigator when he reteamed with Anderson in the film adaptation of Thomas Pynchon's novel Inherent Vice (2014). Both roles earned him nominations for the Golden Globe Award for Best Actor  – Motion Picture Musical or Comedy. In 2017, his performance as the damaged savior of sex-trafficking victims in You Were Never Really Here netted him the Cannes Film Festival Award for Best Actor. In 2019, his portrayal as Arthur Fleck in the psychological thriller Joker earned him critical acclaim along with his first Academy Award for Best Actor, among other accolades.

Film

Television

Executive producer only

See also 
 List of awards and nominations received by Joaquin Phoenix

References 

Phoenix, Joaquin
Phoenix, Joaquin
Filmography